Asterogyne is a genus of flowering plant in the family Arecaceae native to Central America and northern South America, with three of the five known species endemic to Venezuela.

It contains the following species:

 Asterogyne guianensis Granv. & A.J.Hend. - French Guiana
 Asterogyne martiana  (H.Wendl.) H.Wendl. ex Drude - Colombia, Ecuador, Central America from Belize to Panama
 Asterogyne ramosa  (H.E.Moore) Wess.Boer - Paria Peninsula in Venezuela
 Asterogyne spicata (H.E.Moore) Wess.Boer - Miranda State in Venezuela
 Asterogyne yaracuyense  A.J.Hend. & Steyerm. - Cerro La Chapa in Lara State in Venezuela

References

 
Arecaceae genera
Neotropical realm flora
Taxonomy articles created by Polbot
Taxa named by Joseph Dalton Hooker